Sardar Baldev Olakh is the state minister of Uttar Pradesh with independent charge.

Political career
Sardar Baldev Olakh got the ministries of Minorities welfare, Irrigation (engineering).

See also
 Yogi Adityanath ministry (2017–)

References

Living people
People from Mathura
Uttar Pradesh MLAs 2017–2022
Bharatiya Janata Party politicians from Uttar Pradesh
State cabinet ministers of Uttar Pradesh
Yogi ministry
Year of birth missing (living people)